Yawarmayu (Quechua yawar blood, mayu river, "blood river", hispanicized spelling Yahuarmayo) is a river in Peru located in the Puno Region, Carabaya Province, Ayapata District. It originates near the border of the districts Ayapata and Coasa. Its direction is mainly to the northwest where it meets Inambari River as a right affluent. The confluence is north of the village Yawarmayu (Yahuarmayo).

References

Rivers of Peru
Rivers of Puno Region